The Panama City Panama Temple is the 127th operating temple of the Church of Jesus Christ of Latter-day Saints (LDS Church). It was announced in 2002 and was dedicated on August 10, 2008 by church president Thomas S. Monson. Located in Cárdenas, a suburb of Panama City, it is the first church temple in Panama.

The plans to build a temple in Panama City were announced by the LDS Church on August 23, 2002. Ground was broken and the site was dedicated on October 30, 2005, by Spencer V. Jones, a member of the church's Second Quorum of the Seventy and the president of the church's Central America Area. On May 4, 2007, a statue of the angel Moroni was added to the temple's spire.

The temple is adjacent to the LDS Church's Cárdenas Ward meetinghouse, close to the Panama Canal. The Panama City Panama Temple serves Latter-day Saints in all of Panama. There are 39,000 Latter-day Saints in Panama in seven stakes and eight mission districts.

The open house for the temple began on the July 11 and ended on July 26, 2008. During the open house, the temple was open to everyone; however, since it has been dedicated only members of the church in good standing can enter. The temple's dedication was held on August 10, 2008 in four sessions. Prior to the dedication, a cultural celebration was held including performances by Panamanian youth members of the church.

See also

 The Church of Jesus Christ of Latter-day Saints in Panama
 Comparison of temples of The Church of Jesus Christ of Latter-day Saints
 List of temples of The Church of Jesus Christ of Latter-day Saints
 List of temples of The Church of Jesus Christ of Latter-day Saints by geographic region
 Temple architecture (Latter-day Saints)

References

External links
Panama City Panama Temple Official site
Panama City Panama Temple at ChurchofJesusChristTemples.org

21st-century Latter Day Saint temples
Buildings and structures in Panama City
Religious buildings and structures in Panama
Religious buildings and structures completed in 2008
Temples (LDS Church) in Latin America
Temples (LDS Church) in North America
The Church of Jesus Christ of Latter-day Saints in Panama
2008 establishments in Panama